AT Conference, Inc. is a global provider of audio conferencing and web conferencing services.

History 
American Teleconnect was founded in 1999 by President and CEO, David Jannetti. On May 2, 2006, the company announced that its name had been officially changed to AT Conference.

AT Conference is headquartered in Southampton, New York. The company also has operations in Georgia and Massachusetts.

Products and services 
AT Conference provides global reservation-less conference calling, web conferencing, and operator-assisted conferencing. Other services include call recording, transcription service, application and desktop sharing, live polling, and presenter video-casting.

The company uses a cloud-based call management application and a proprietary cloud-based account management tool.

Acquisitions 
 October 2007 - California-based Tiger Communications
 January 2008 - Georgia-based A Professional Conference Call
 September 2008 - Wisconsin-based MixMeeting's Conferencing Division
 January 2012 - Alabama-based EnterConference

Awards and recognition 
 2004 - Inc. 500
 2006 - Ranked 433 in the Deloitte New York Technology Fast 500
Deloitte Technology Fast 500

 2008 - Inc. 5000
 2009 - Ranked 429 in Deloitte Technology Fast 500
Inc. 5000
 2010 - Deloitte Technology Fast 500
Inc. 5000
 2011 - Inc. 5000
 2013 -Inc. 5000 Honor Roll Alumni

References

External links

Telecommunications companies established in 1999
Telecommunications companies of the United States
Privately held companies based in New York (state)
1999 establishments in New York (state)